Bruce Palmer (born November 12, 1955) is an American professional basketball coach who coached primarily in the Australian National Basketball League (NBL).

Palmer began coaching in the NBL in 1987 with the North Melbourne Giants, after coaching the Dandenong Rangers in the VBA. In 1988 he was awarded NBL Coach of the Year though the Giants would lose the NBL Grand Final series to the Canberra Cannons. The following year, the Giants won the championship over the Cannons.

Palmer moved to the Brisbane Bullets in 1993, although he was unsuccessful in bringing the team the level of success he saw with the Giants. He left the team after three seasons and took a break from coaching in the NBL, during which he coached representative youth basketball. In 1998 he worked as an assistant coach with the Brisbane Bullets under head coach Brian Kerle.

Between 2000 and 2003, Palmer coached in Asia and the Middle East  before returning to the NBL as head coach of the Hunter Pirates. Palmer was fired part way through the season in a controversial management decision.

He is the seventh winningest coach in NBL history, with a win–loss record of 184–104.

Since 2004, Palmer coached representative youth basketball as both head coach and assistant coach, including the Australian Under 20 men's team.

He was the head coach for the Brisbane Capitals in the Australian Basketball Association League.

Head coaching record

|-
| style="text-align:left;"|Link Tochigi Brex
| style="text-align:left;"|2010-11
| 16||7||9|||| style="text-align:center;"|6th in JBL |||-||-||-||
| style="text-align:center;"|-
|-
| style="text-align:left;"|Link Tochigi Brex
| style="text-align:left;"|2011-12
| 38||17||21|||| style="text-align:center;"|Fired|||-||-||-||
| style="text-align:center;"|-
|-

References

External links
College statistics

1955 births
Living people
American expatriate basketball people in Australia
American men's basketball coaches
American men's basketball players
Australian men's basketball coaches
National Basketball League (Australia) coaches
Pacific Tigers men's basketball players
Utsunomiya Brex coaches